La Quina is a Middle and Early Upper Palaeolithic site in Gardes-le-Pontaroux, Charente, France. Two Neanderthal skulls were found there, La Quina 5 and La Quina 18. It is the type site of the Quina Mousterian.

It was discovered in 1872, and was classified as a French monument historique in 1984.

References

Archaeological sites in France
Paleolithic sites
Rock shelters